Schweisweiler is a municipality in the Donnersbergkreis district, in Rhineland-Palatinate, Germany.

Historic buildings and monuments
There are ten historic buildings in Schweisweiler, including four wood beamed houses dating from the 1780s, the village church, and the local community hall.  There are five additional monuments within the local area that are within a moderate walking distance.  The historic buildings and a local area map showing the monuments are included on an informational board on the street across from the community hall.

Museum
Leo's Tenne is both a museum and a meeting place with seating for up to 50 people.  The museum has tools and equipment on display that show crafts prevalent in the local area over 100 years ago.  Of interest are the agricultural, foundry and blacksmithing tools that can still be used to demonstrate early craftsmanship.  Tours are mostly given during the warmer days of the year. The proprietor and owner, Mr. Leo Dörr, can be contacted to arrange tours and to provide explanations of any items found in the museum's collection.

Clubs
The Fishing Club (Fischerverein) promotes fishing within the community.

The Exercise Club (Turnverein) holds gymnastic and exercise classes for young children, has separate men's/women's exercise classes.

The Gun Club (Schützenverein) has a wide variety of sport shooting activities.  Activities range from air rifle to large caliber shooting on a 50-meter range.

The Soccer Fan Club (Betzedeivel) supports the region's professional soccer team the 1st Football Club Kaiserslautern (1FCK), better known as the "Red Devils".

The Volunteer Fire Department Supporters (Freiwillig Feuerwehr Förderverein) brings together supporters of the volunteer fire department, holds fund-raising events, and provides fire fighting protective gear at no cost to volunteer firefighters.

Religion
The village has a Catholic church with services held on Sundays and holidays.  Protestant services are held in the local community hall.

Theater
The village has a theater group made mostly up of local people. Plays involving current social themes are intertwined with the local dialect to produce region-specific social commentary. Performances are held in the village community hall once a year, four times (over two weekends) to sold-out audiences.

Nature
The village is located in a valley with walking areas on each side of the valley.  The south side of the village has a nature trail (Naturlehrpfad) with signs detailing specific types of trees and vegetation. There are several information posters and learning experiments along the approximately  trail.

Business
There is one locally-run bakery (Bäckerei Haas) open every day but Sunday.

There are two holiday (vacation) houses for rent.  These vacation houses are used by both tourists and locals since the affordable prices are ideal for vacations or lodging visiting guests.

References

Municipalities in Rhineland-Palatinate
Donnersbergkreis